The 1965 Florida Gators football team represented the University of Florida during the 1965 NCAA University Division football season. The season was Ray Graves's sixth year as the Florida Gators football team's head coach.  The highlights of the season included an intersectional road victory over the Northwestern Wildcats of the Big Ten Conference, Southeastern Conference (SEC) wins over the LSU (14–7), Ole Miss Rebels (17–0), Georgia Bulldogs (14–10) and Tulane Green Wave (51–13), and a sound thumping of the in-state rival Florida State Seminoles (30–17).  The Gators also lost close matches against the Mississippi State Bulldogs (13–18) and the Miami Hurricanes (13–16).  Graves' 1965 Florida Gators finished 7–4 overall and 4–2 in the SEC, placing third in the eleven-team conference.

Schedule

Primary source: 2015 Florida Gators Football Media Guide

Attendance figures: University of Florida 1966 Football Brochure.

Roster

Postseason
At the end of the season, the Gators played the Missouri Tigers in the Gators' first-ever major bowl game, the Sugar Bowl, on January 1, 1966.  Despite a three-touchdown second-half effort from the Gators, they lost to the Tigers 18–20 after they failed to score on three consecutive two-point conversion attempts after each of their touchdowns.  Following the game, Gators quarterback Steve Spurrier was recognized as the game's Most Valuable Player—the only MVP selected from the losing team in the history of the Sugar Bowl.

References

Florida
Florida Gators football seasons
Florida Gators football